Benoît Pilon (born July 27, 1962) is a francophone Canadian director and screenwriter particularly noted for his innovative films and documentaries on the human condition. He is also the co-founder of "Les Films de l'autre" productions, which produces, promotes and helps the development of independent films throughout North America.

Career
Benoît Pilon earned a B.A. in film studies at Concordia University. He went on to form Les Films de l'Autre in 1988 with Manon Briand and others, an independent production co-op dedicated to auteur-driven films. His short 2003 short, Roger Toupin, épicier variété, won a Prix Jutra for best documentary, His debut feature, The Necessities of Life, which was written in collaboration with Bernard Émond, was a multi-award winner – four Genies, including best director for Pilon, and three Prix Jutras, including best picture and screenplay.

Filmography

Director 
 La Rivière rit - 1987
  Rap sur la « Main » - 1994
 Regards volés - 1994
 Rosaire et la Petite-Nation - 1997
 Réseaux - 1998, TV series 
 3 soeurs en 2 temps - 2003
 Roger Toupin, épicier variété - 2003 
 Le temps des Québécois - 2004
 Nestor et les oubliés - 2006 
 Des nouvelles du Nord - 2007
 Hôtel de la grève - 2007
 The Necessities of Life (Ce qu'il faut pour vivre) - 2008
 Trash (Décharge) - 2011
 Iqaluit - 2016
 The Vinland Club (Le Club Vinland) - 2020

Second Unit Director or Assistant Director 
 Au chic resto pop (1990)
 The Pianist (1991) 
 La Fourmi et le volcan, aka The Ant and the Volcano (1992) 
 The Sex of the Stars (Le Sexe des étoiles) (1993) 
 Jalna (1994) TV mini-series  
 Picoti Picota  (1995) 
 Marguerite Volant (1996) TV mini-series

Awards and recognition
 2008: Special Grand Prize of Jury; Most popular film; Most popular Canadian film; Montreal World Film Festival, Genie Award for Best Achievement in Direction, The Necessities of Life (Ce qu'il faut pour vivre) 
 2003: Jutra Award, Best documentary, features;  Bayard D'or for best documentary features at the Namur International Film Festival, Roger Toupin, épicier variété 
 1995: Golden Sheaf Award for Best Drama Over 30 mins, Regards volés

External links

 Benoît Pilon at the National Film Board of Canada
 Les Films de l'Autre Productions official website

1962 births
Best Director Genie and Canadian Screen Award winners
French Quebecers
Living people
Film directors from Quebec